is a passenger railway station located in the town of Nagatoro, Saitama, Japan, operated by the private railway operator Chichibu Railway.

Lines

Station layout
The station is staffed and consists of one side platform and one island platform serving three tracks in total. Track 3 is a bidirectional line used by freight services.

Platforms

Adjacent stations

History
The station was renamed Nogami on 16 December 1929.

Passenger statistics
In fiscal 2018, the station was used by an average of 649 passengers daily.

Surrounding area
 Nagatoro Town Office
 Ara River

References

External links

 Nogami Station information (Saitama Prefectural Government) 
 Nogami Station timetable 

Railway stations in Japan opened in 1911
Railway stations in Saitama Prefecture
Nagatoro, Saitama